Sokratis Kokkalis (Greek: Σωκράτης Κόκκαλης; 1939) is a Greek businessman. His father, Petros Kokkalis, was a communist politician and Greek Resistance member, living in exile in East Germany after the end of the Greek Civil War.

Business
Kokkalis is the founder and majority shareholder of Intracom Holdings, one of the largest multinational technology groups in Southern Europe, and the chairman and majority shareholder of Intralot S.A., a gaming technology supplier and licensed lottery operator. He has established and presides over the Kokkalis Foundation, a non-profit organization that "promotes education and training, culture and social welfare, medical research and information technology, and athletics", both in Greece and abroad. In 2015 Socrates Kokkalis net worth is estimated to be around US$1.2 billion.

Kokkalis founded Intracom in 1977 as a telecommunication equipment supplier and manufacturer. The company played a leading role in the modernization of telecommunication infrastructure in Greece, especially through a partnership with Ericsson for the manufacturing of digital switches. Intracom expanded in Southeastern Europe and became a leading exporting technology Group, including the areas of software for the public sector, defense electronics and construction. It is listed in the Athens Stock Exchange since 1990.

Kokkalis founded Intralot in 1992, as a hardware and software supplier for the gaming industry. Intralot became one of the three top companies in the sector worldwide, currently with 5,400 employees and presence in 35 countries. Intralot has a strong presence in the United States, with a 20% market share for lotteries, offering its services to 11 State lotteries.

Kokkalis also led Panafon, the mobile venture of Vodafone in Greece, immediately after the launch of mobile telephony in Greece in 1992.

In 2005 Intracom became a Holding company and acquired Hellas Online, an ISP provider which became a major telephony and Internet supplier. Hellas Online was sold to Vodafone in 2014. The same year Intracom Holdings divested also form the telecom manufacturing arm, Intracom Telecom. The Holding today owns three major companies, the construction branch Intrakat, the software developer Intrasoft International, which is an Oracle partner and a major supplier to the European Commission and the European Parliament, and Intracom Defense Electronics, with a strong partnership with Raytheon. The three companies today employ 2,200 people and have presence in 70 countries around the world. Most of the Group revenues come from exports and international activities.

Sports
Kokkalis was owner of Olympiacos BC since the early 1990s. During his presidency the basketball club won five Greek championships, three Greek Cups and one Euroleague in 1997, making the Triple Crown the same year.

He was also for 18 years, until 30 December 2010, owner and chairman of the Greek football club Olympiacos FC. He took the club after the difficult years of the Koskotas scandal and managed to bring it back in success.

During his tenure the club won 12 top division titles, five Greek Cups, and one Greek Super Cup. It was also during his chairmanship that Olympiacos leased from the Greek state for a period of 50 years and reconstructed their homeground Karaiskakis Stadium. It was until that time used by Olympiacos and other Piraeus clubs strictly on a rental basis, and undertook a complete rebuilding of the stadium itself.

Controversies
German authorities' investigations in the Stasi archives found a 350-page report referring to agent "Rocco" ("953/63") and later "Kaskade" and "Krokus". It was alleged that "Rocco" was the code name for Sokratis Kokkalis, allegedly recruited on 25 January 1963. Kokkalis was alleged to have subsequently bribed Greek officials for the national telecommunications company of Greece to purchase East German telecommunications equipment.

The German Federal Parliament, conducted a detailed investigation and concluded in 1998, that there has been no evidence linking Kokkalis activities and his companies to East Germany.

Kostas Tsimas, a former chief of the Greek intelligence service (EYP) and very close friend of former Greek Prime Minister Andreas Papandreou, stated that Kokkalis is "a Greek patriot", who "worked for Greek national interests in the Balkans and elsewhere".

Kokkalis was criticized by Greek and international media about his activities in Russia, where his company Intralot had sold lottery equipment, technological know-how and software. However, no formal charges were ever filed for any Intralot representative, and the Russian government expressed its trust in Kokkalis and Intralot.

Extensive criticism was also received in the Romanian press by Kokkalis and the companies Intralot and Intracom for allegedly bribing Romanian officials into signing and extending contracts between the Greek firms and the Romanian Lottery that were thoroughly disadvantageous for the Romanian side, with losses totalling up to 1bn Euros as of April 2014.

Honours
Kokkalis was made a John Harvard fellow in 1997, and received awards from The Fulbright Foundation and the American Academy of Achievement for "his leadership in creating educational opportunities and building bridges of cooperation."

References

External links
The Kokkalis Foundation official website
Intracom Holdings Group corporate website

1939 births
Living people
People of the Stasi
Greek billionaires
Businesspeople from Athens
Olympiacos F.C. presidents
Olympiacos B.C. presidents
Intracom Group
People named in the Panama Papers